The Rhume is a  long river in Lower Saxony, Germany. It is a right tributary of the Leine. Its source is the karstic spring of Rhume Spring in Rhumspringe, south of the Harz mountain range. The water drains with high pressure from the ground of the funnel-shaped well, known for its turquoise colour.

The Rhume then flows in northwesterly direction through the municipalities of Gieboldehausen, Katlenburg-Lindau and Northeim. It finally joins the Leine river west of Northeim.

Tributaries
 Eller
 Hahle
 Oder 
 Söse
 Düne (also called Uhbach)

See also
List of rivers of Lower Saxony

References

 
Rivers of Lower Saxony
Rivers of the Harz
Rivers of Germany